Can't Stop the Machine is a two-disc CD/DVD release by the industrial metal band American Head Charge. The audio disc contains one new track ("Downstream"), three remastered tracks, five live tracks and one remix.

Track listing

Notes 
 Tracks 7-9 are remastered tracks from the band's 1999 release Trepanation.
 The DVD features unreleased footage with special features including the official music videos for "All Wrapped Up", "Just So You Know" and "Loyalty".
 "Downstream" was released as a bonus track on the UK version of The Feeding.

2007 albums
American Head Charge albums